Little Wildflower is the third studio album by Australian country music singer Catherine Britt. The album was released in January 2008 and peaked at number 44 on the ARIA Charts.
 
At the ARIA Music Awards of 2008, the album was nominated for the ARIA Award for Best Country Album.

Track listing

Charts

Weekly charts

Year-end charts

Release history

References

 

2008 albums
Catherine Britt albums